Martin Riška (born 18 May 1975 in Žilina) is a Slovak former racing cyclist. He competed at the 2000 Summer Olympics and the 2004 Summer Olympics.

Major results

1996 
 1st  Road race, National Road Championships
2002
 1st GP ZTS Dubnica nad Váhom
 National Road Championships
1st  Road race
2nd Time trial
 1st Stage 4 Paths of King Nikola
2003
 1st  Road race, National Road Championships
 1st Stage 2 Paths of King Nikola
2004
 1st  Road race, National Road Championships
 1st Stage 2 Okolo Slovenska
2005
 1st Grand Prix Bradlo
 2nd Overall Okolo Slovenska
1st Stage 1
2006
 1st Overall Tour de Hongrie
1st Stages 1 & 3
 1st Stage 2 Istrian Spring Trophy
 1st Stage 1 Tour of Greece
 National Road Championships
3rd Road race
3rd Time trial
2007
 1st  Road race, National Road Championships
 Bałtyk–Karkonosze Tour
1st Stages 1 & 8
 1st Stage 5 Tour de Hongrie
 2nd Völkermarkter Radsporttage
2008
 1st GP Vorarlberg
 1st Stage 2 Tour de Hongrie
2009
 2nd Raiffeisen Grand Prix

References

External links

1975 births
Living people
Slovak male cyclists
Sportspeople from Žilina
Olympic cyclists of Slovakia
Cyclists at the 2000 Summer Olympics
Cyclists at the 2004 Summer Olympics